The Islamic Republic of Iran Railways (abbreviated as IRIR, or sometimes as RAI) is the national state-owned railway system of Iran. The Raja Passenger Train Company is an associate of the IR, and manages its passenger trains. The Railway Transportation Company is an associate of the IR, which manages its freight transport. The Ministry of Roads & Urban Development is the state agency that oversees the IRIR. Some 33 million tonnes of goods and 29 million passengers are transported annually by the rail transportation network, accounting for 9 percent and 11 percent of all transportation in Iran, respectively (2011).

History

Qajar dynasty 

In 1886, during the time of Nasser-al-Din Shah, an 8.7 km  horse-driven suburban railway was established south of Tehran, which was later converted to steam. This line was closed in 1952. The First Iranian railway was set up in 1887 between Mahmudabad and Amol; its construction was completely private. However it was not used because of several problems. The Tabriz–Jolfa line (146 km) was built in 1914, the Sufiyan–Sharafkhaneh line (53 km) in 1916, and the Mirjaveh–Zahedan line (93 km) in 1920.

World War II

The railroad was built with rail weighing  and required more than 3000 bridges. Grades averaged 1.5 percent south of Tehran, but then increased to 2.8 percent to cross the  pass between Tehran and the Caspian Sea.

Anglo-Soviet Invasion of Iran

After the Anglo-Soviet invasion of Iran in 1941, this Persian Corridor became one of the supply routes for war material for the Soviet Union during World War II (Railway trend in Iran).  The invading British built a  branch line from the  bridge over the Karun River in Ahvaz to a new southern port at Khorramshahr on the Arvand Rud river. In 1943, 3,473 American soldiers of the Military Railway Service began running trains between the Persian Gulf and Caspian Sea using ALCO RS-1 locomotives rebuilt with 3-axle trucks and designated RSD-1. The Americans set up headquarters in Ahvaz, but were unable to tolerate the daytime heat, and generally operated the railway at night. The Persian Gulf Command ran trains day and night.

Challenging construction

The Trans-Iranian railway traverses many mountain ranges, and is full of spirals and 1 in 36 (2.78%) ruling grades. Much of the terrain was unmapped when construction took place, and its geology unknown. Several stretches of line, including tunnels, were built through unsuitable geology, and had to be replaced before the line opened. For example
 one tunnel went through a salt dome so that ground water was bound to dissolve the foundations; this tunnel and its approaches had to be completely replaced.

Nevertheless, the line was completed ahead of schedule. In recent years the railways have undergone significant extensions including the 1977 linking to the western railway system at the Turkish border, the 1993 opening of the Bandar Abbas line providing better access to the sea, and the 1996 opening of the Mashad–Sarakhs extension as part of the Silk Road railway to link to the landlocked Central Asian Countries.

Railway construction

In December 2014, a rail line from Iran opened to Turkmenistan and Kazakhstan. The opening of the line marks the first direct rail link between Iran, Kazakhstan and China, and upon completion of the Marmaray rail project direct rail transport between China and Europe (while avoiding Russia) will be possible.

Rolling stock

Iran Railways uses a variety of rolling stock for their services. Trains are operated with diesel and electric locomotives. Steam locomotives have been phased out. Diesel is a strategic industry, and by using this heavy oil as a fuel instead of gas for locomotives, the Islamic Republic of Iran has joined the 12 world countries which manufacture this type of engine.

Operations

In 2008, the IR operated 11,106 km of rail with a further 18,900 km in various stages of development. The extent of double-track lines is 1,082 km. The Jolfa–Tabriz line is electrified( 148 km). In 2006, IR reported that it possessed 565 engines, 1,192 passenger coaches, and 16,330 wagons. The vast majority of the engines are diesel-powered.

Expansion

The majority of transportation in Iran is road-based. The government plans to transport 3.5% of the passenger volume and 8.5% of the freight volume by rail. Extensive electrification is planned. The railway network expands by about 500 km per year according to the Ministry of R&T. According to plan, Iran's railway lines are to reach 15,000 kilometers by 2015 and 25,000 kilometers by the year 2025. The State Railways Company has 300 locomotives with an average lifespan of 40 years. The Islamic Republic of Iran Railways, the Iran Power Plant Projects Management (Mapna) and Germany's Siemens have signed a contract for 150 IranRunner locomotives for passenger trains. Siemens is committed to exporting to Iran some 30 locomotives in the first phase, and to manufacturing another 120 using domestic capacities and expertise over the next 6 years (2007). MLC (Mapna Locomotive Engineering and Manufacturing Company) is the manufacturing company responsible for this production. Another locomotive manufacturer in Iran is Wagon Pars which builds AD43C locomotives in partnership with Iranian power plant maker DESA diesel. In 2009, €17 billion in foreign investment in the rail industry has been secured, according to the Ministry of Road and Transportation of Iran.

Affiliate companies

Raja Passenger Train Company is an associate of the Islamic Republic of Iran Railways (IRIR) and manages its passenger trains, including international trains linking Tehran to Istanbul and Damascus. Raja Passenger Train Company carried more than 4 million passengers during 2003–05. The number of passengers traveling by rail increased from 11.7 million in 2000 to 17.3 million in the year ending March 2005. Every passenger wagon annually carries 7,340 passengers per kilometer on average (whereas the figure is 3,950 people per kilometer in Turkey and 5,220 passengers per kilometer in Egypt). Private enterprises are expected to operate 5,000 wagons by 2009 (50% of total).
Railway Transportation Company is also a subsidiary of the IRIR which manages its freight transport while the Ministry of Roads and Transportation is the state agency that oversees the IRIR. In Iran, for every wagon, some 1,050 tons of freight are being transported (2008).
Zarand Company provides the national railroad system with freight and passenger train carriages.

Network and corridors
The railway network converges on Tehran. The Iranian cities of Isfahan and Shiraz were linked to Tehran in 2009. Further extension of this line to Bushehr and Bandar Abbas is planned. Furthermore, the construction of Chabahar-Zahedan-Mashhad railway, extending from southeast to northeast of the country to the length of 1,350 kilometers, started in 2010 with 3 billion euro credit. The western railway extension links to Turkey at the Rāzī–Kapıköy border. There is a northern connection to Azerbaijan, the Caucasus, and Russia has a bogie-changing station at the border at Jolfa. The southern routes connect Tehran to the Persian Gulf ports of Bandar Imam and Bandar Abbas. A line to the Caspian Sea ends at the terminal of Amir Abad and at Bandar Torkaman, and is part of a north–south corridor to Russia and Scandinavia. The north-east corridor connects Mashhad and continues further to the bogie-changing station at Sarakhs. For the landlocked countries of Turkmenistan, Uzbekistan, Tajikistan, Kyrgyzstan, and Kazakhstan this line provides access to the sea. A recent connection from Mashhad to Bafq has significantly shortened access to the port city of Bandar Abbas. Tehran-Mashhad with a length of 900 kilometers, Tehran-Qom-Esfahan with a length of 410 kilometers (under construction), Qazvin-Rasht-Anzali-Astara with a length of 370 kilometers; will all be built with help from China at a cost of $12 billion. In total, Iran has signed a number of contracts with China for the development of 5,000 kilometres of railway lines.

North-South Railway
The north–south railway is complete between Qazvin and Bandar Abbas; the line was expected to be completed as far as Azerbaijan by the end of 2016. Qazvin to Astara is the missing link in the North-South Transportation Corridor, which links India, Iran, Azerbaijan, Russia and Finland. Qazvin Rasht railway was completed in 2018 and Rasht Astara railway needs another four years to be completed.

Links to Azerbaijan and Armenia
Iran's first rail link to the outside world appeared simultaneously with the beginning of the country's railway system, as Iran's first major railway (1916) connected Tabriz with Jolfa on the border with the Russian Empire. The link continued its importance throughout the USSR era; Iran and the USSR signed an agreement on cross-border rail transport in 1940, and amended it in 1958. It is reported that during the late-Soviet era, some 350 railcars crossed the border at Jolfa daily, with the annual amount of cross-border freight reaching 3.5 million tons. However, after the breakup of the USSR and the closing of the border between Armenia and Azerbaijan the Jolfa connection became a dead end, as it only links Iran with the isolated Nakhichevan exclave of the Republic of Azerbaijan. In 2007, Iranian Railways, Azerbaijan State Railway and Russian Railways agreed on implementing the project to build a new line between Qazvin, Resht, Astara, Iran and Astara, Azerbaijan. In April 2017, Russia and India celebrated 70 years of diplomatic relations and vowed to complete the North-South Transportation Corridor (NSTC) with the help of Iran. The NSTC reduces time and cost of travel by 30-40%.There is presently no direct railway connection between Iran and Armenia, even though the two countries share a border. In 2009, Iran and Armenia agreed to build a railway linking Armenia with Iran's Persian Gulf ports.

Links to Central Asia
In 1996, Mashhad–Sarakhs extension connected Iran to Turkmenistan, as part of the Silk Road railway to link to the landlocked Central Asian Countries. Former states of the Soviet Union have railways using a  Russian gauge, thus the Iranian Railways maintain break-of-gauge services at borders to Azerbaijan and Turkmenistan, and beyond brief wide-track rail segments to the border crossing. The Kazakhstan-Turkmenistan-Iran railway link is a part of the North-South Transport Corridor and is a long railway line connecting the Central Asian countries of Kazakhstan and Turkmenistan with Iran and the Persian Gulf. It will link Uzen in Kazakhstan with Bereket - Etrek in Turkmenistan and end at Gorgan in Iran's Golestan province. In Iran, the railway will be linked to national network making its way to the ports of the Persian Gulf. The project is estimated to cost $620m which is being jointly funded by the governments of Kazakhstan, Turkmenistan and Iran.

Links to Iraq, Syria and Afghanistan

Feasibility studies were started on Khorramshahr-Basra and Kermanshah-Baghdad links with Iraq. , the Iranian line to Khorramshahr was finished, but construction had not started on the track from the Iraqi border to Basra. In 2017, the West Corridor known locally as Rahahane Gharb was expanded from Arak to Malayer and Kermanshah. The Iranian government plans on expanding the network further to Khosravi (Iran-Iraq) border. China Civil Engineering Construction Corp is building the Malayer-Khosravi corridor, which will eventually run to the border with Iraq. On 27 December 2021, Iran and Iraq agreed to build a railway connecting both countries.The project would connect Basra in southern Iraq to Shalamcheh in western Iran. There are only around 30 kilometers (18 miles) between the two areas. The railway would be strategically important for Iran, linking the country to the Mediterranean Sea via Iraq and Syria's railways.

Mashhad-Khvaf-Afghanistan's Border-Islam Qala railway is being constructed by an Iranian firm, with funding from the Afghan government, but the section in Afghanistan remains incomplete. The works on remaining  section of the project between Rahzanak and Herat is in progress. The works on both sides are done as development assistance to Afghanistan by Iran. The new Khaf - Rahzanak rail line continues from Khaf to Torbat-e Heydarieh where it links with Mashhad - Bafq railway line a crucial rail link opened in 2009 which connects port city, Bandar Abbas in Persian Gulf with north eastern city of Mashhad and from there with Turkmenistan through Sarakhs.

Link to Turkey, and International Standard Gauge route to Europe 
In 1977, the Iranian railways linked to the western railway system at the Turkish border.

Link to Pakistan 
The construction of the railway from Bam to Zahedan was completed in early 2009 connecting Tehran to Pakistan border with an opening ceremony on 19 July 2009. The freight traffic was discontinued however after the initial trial trains, and was only revived in 2015. Iranian Railways have been trying to persuade Pakistan Railways to convert its route to Quetta to standard gauge, in order to facilitate the flow of international traffic to Europe. Pakistan responded in 2006 with a statement that it is to convert its network to standard gauge, and would plan a link with the standard gauge system of China. A through passenger service is being considered to supplement the occasional Quetta-Zahedan service, itself a poor shadow of the former Pakistan-Iran 'Taftan Express'.

International railway links with neighboring countries 
  Afghanistan-open- standard gauge.
  Armenia-no link-break-of-gauge .
  Azerbaijan-open-break-of-gauge -only via the Azerbaijani exclave Nakhchivan; a railway link to Azerbaijan proper is being built.
  Iraq-no link- standard gauge.
  Pakistan-open-break-of-gauge .
  Turkey-open- standard gauge.
  Turkmenistan-open-break-of-gauge..

Railway electrification

Although railway electrification in Iran was started in 1975, it was halted for almost 30 years. A contract for electrification of the Tehran-Mashhad double-track line and the supply of 70 electric locomotives was awarded in 2009. Speeds of up to 200 km/h for locomotive-hauled passenger trains and 250 km/h for tilting EMUs are expected to reduce existing journey times of 7.5 to 12 to less than 5 hours. As recently as July 2017 the Iranian Government has completed a loan agreement for the Tehran – Mashhad electrification project.

Commuter railway services
Local Rail, also referred to as Suburban Rail or Commuter rail when originating from a large city and covering its suburbs, is a class of rail services, using railbus-type trains, running a distance of about 50 km to 200 km, and serving all stations. Currently there are the following services:

Tehran
Tehran-Parand
Tehran-Jamkaran
Tehran-Qom
Tehran-Pishva
Tehran-Firuzkuh
Tabriz
Tabriz-Azarbaijan Shahid Madani University
Tabriz-Jolfa
Tabriz-Maragheh
Tabriz-Salmas (Once every two weeks)
Khuzestan
Ahvaz (Karun Station)-Sarbandar
Ahvaz (Karun Station)-Bandar-e Mahshahr
Ahvaz (Ahvaz Station)-Khorramshahr
Ahvaz (Ahvaz Station)-Andimeshk
Andimeshk-Dorud
Lorestan
Dorud-Cham Sangar
Mashhad
Mashhad-Binalud-Neishabur
Mashhad-Sarakhs
Mazandaran-Golestan (Shomal Division)
Gorgan-Pol-e Sefid
Gorgan-Incheh Borun
Qazvin
Hashtgerd-Qazvin (Planned)

High-speed rail

Currently there is one high speed railway line under construction between Tehran and Isfahan passing through Qom. The length of the line is 410 km; completion is planned for 2021.

Construction of another high speed rail line between Qom and Arak is under way as well.

See also
 Iranian railway industry
 Railway stations in Iran
 DESA diesel
 Tehran Metro
 North–South Transport Corridor
 Ashgabat agreement, a Multimodal transport agreement signed by India, Oman, Iran, Turkmenistan, Uzbekistan and Kazakhstan, for creating an international transport and transit corridor facilitating transportation of goods between Central Asia and the Persian Gulf.

References

External links
 Iran's Official Universal Tourism Portal
 Raja Rail Transport Company (Buying Iran Train Tickets) Website
 Ministry of Roads & Urban Development Of Iran Official Website 
 Islamic Republic of Iran Railways Official Website 
 Iranian Rail Industries Development Co (IRICO) Official Website
 Unofficial website
 2005 update on status of Iran's railways

Railway companies of Iran
1520 mm gauge railways in Iran
5 ft 6 in gauge railways in Iran
Standard gauge railways in Iran
Iranian brands
Government-owned railway companies